Gunn Elin Flakne (born 8 January 1964) is a Norwegian politician for the Labour Party.

In the 2005, 2009 and 2013 elections she was elected as a deputy representative to the Parliament of Norway from Sør-Trøndelag. She hails from Tydal and has served as an elected member of Sør-Trøndelag county council.

References

1964 births
Living people
People from Sør-Trøndelag
Labour Party (Norway) politicians
Sør-Trøndelag politicians
Deputy members of the Storting
Women members of the Storting